Debaucher is a village in the Roche-à-Bateaux commune of the Côteaux Arrondissement, in the Sud department of Haiti.

See also
Ti Nance
Roche-à-Bateaux

References

Populated places in Sud (department)